The Giardino Montano per la Conservazione della Biodiversità "Ruggero Tomaselli", also known as the Giardino Botanico Alpino "Ruggero Tomaselli" and the Giardino Botanico "Ruggero Tomaselli", is a  nature preserve, arboretum and botanical garden in Italy. It is located inside the Cittadella di Scienze della Natura at the summit of the Campo dei Fiori di Varese (elevation ), in the Province of Varese, Lombardy. It is open on weekends in the warmer months.

The garden was established in 1956 and named in honor of botanist Ruggero Tomaselli.

Exhibits
Its collections include: 
 
 Aconitum napellus
 Arum maculatum
 Atropa belladonna
 Caltha palustris
 Campanula raineri
 Cephalanthera longifolia
 Colchicum autumnale
 Daphne laureola
 Daphne mezereum
 Daphne striata
 Digitalis purpurea
 Draba aizoides
 Dryas octopetala
 Epilobium hirsutum
 Epipactis atropurpurea
 Equisetum arvense
 Filipendula ulmaria
 Gentiana verna
 Globularia
 Gymnadenia conopsea
 Helleborus foetidus
 Helleborus niger
 Horminum pyrenaicum
 Iris pseudacorus
 Linaria alpina
 Listera obovata
 Menyanthes trifoliata
 Orchis maculata
 Orchis mascula
 Osmunda regalis
 Paris quadrifolia
 Polemonium coeruleum
 Primula auricular
 Primula glaucescens
 Rhododendron ferrugineum
 Rhododendron hirsutum
 Saxifraga
 Sedum
 Sempervivum
 Taxus baccata
 Vaccinium myrtillus
 Vaccinium vitis-idaea
 Veratrum album
 Viola biflora
 Viola palustris.

The garden's arboretum includes: 
 
 Acer campestre
 Acer platanoides
 Acer pseudoplatanus
 Cornus mas
 Corylus avellana
 Laburnum alpinum
 Larix decidua
 Pinus cembra
 Pinus montana
 Pinus mugo
 Pseudotsuga douglasii
 Sambucus racemosa.

See also
List of botanical gardens in Italy

References
Giardino Montano per la Conservazione della Biodiversità "Ruggero Tomaselli"
Regione Lombardia description
Parchi di Lombardia description (Italian)

Botanical gardens in Italy
Province of Varese
Gardens in Lombardy